PlayStation Magazine Ufficiale, also known by the acronym PSMU, initially named as Ufficiale PlayStation Magazine and after as PlayStation 2 Magazine Ufficiale, is the Italian edition of PlayStation: The Official Magazine video game magazine, specializing in all Sony video game consoles and handheld gaming platforms. The magazine features previews, reviews, and cheat codes for Sony games.

External links 
 PlayStation Magazine Ufficiale on Play Media Company corporate site 

2002 establishments in Italy
Italian-language magazines
Monthly magazines published in Italy
Video game magazines published in Italy
Magazines established in 2002
Magazines published in Rome
PlayStation (brand) magazines